"GTFO" (an abbreviation for "Get the fuck out") is a song by American singer and songwriter Mariah Carey. On September 13, 2018, Epic Records released the song as a promotional single from Carey's fifteenth studio album Caution. "GTFO" was written by Carey, Bibi Bourelly, Porter Robinson, Paul "Nineteen85" Jeffries and Jordan Manswell, with the latter two also producing the song. It samples Porter Robinson's 2014 song "Goodbye to a World".

Release

Carey announced "GTFO" would be the first promotional single from her then upcoming fifteenth studio album with the release via press release.

Critical reception
Israel Daramola from Spin was positive, calling it a "ghostly, tender record with a magnetic rhythm". Randall Colburn from Consequence of Sound praised Carey's vocal performance and the song's instrumentation, noting "the song's dreamy flow clashes compellingly." R. Eric Thomas of Elle was also positive stating the track was "[a] sultry mid-tempo addition", noted that song "enters a grand tradition of songs about being told to get out." Billboard editor Gil Kaufman described the song's production as "spiky". It was included at number 59 on Idolators list of the 100 best singles of 2018, and at number 92 on NPR's list of the 100 best songs of 2018.

Music video
The music video for the song was directed by Sarah McColgan. It was premiered via Carey's Vevo channel on September 14, 2018.

Live performances
Mariah Carey performed "GTFO" for the first time at the 2018 iHeartRadio Music Festival. It was also performed at her 2019 Caution World Tour.

Track listing
Digital download
"GTFO" – 3:27

Charts

Release history

References

2018 singles
2018 songs
Mariah Carey songs
Song recordings produced by Porter Robinson
Songs written by Bibi Bourelly
Songs written by Mariah Carey
Songs written by Nineteen85
Songs written by Porter Robinson